The Primator was an international express train.  Introduced in 1986, it ran between Prague, then the capital of Czechoslovakia, and East Berlin, then the capital of the German Democratic Republic (GDR).

Following the major political changes that took place in Central Europe in the second half of 1989, Prague became the capital of the Czech Republic, East Berlin was absorbed by Berlin and the GDR by Germany.

In 1993, under the influence of all of these changes, the Primator was replaced by a new EuroCity train, the Porta Bohemica.

History
The Primator first ran in 1986.  Initially, it was categorised as one of the new top-of-the-line Interexpress services, numbered IEx 76/77.

The train ran between Praha hl.n. in Prague and Berlin-Lichtenberg in East Berlin, on the route and in the time slots previously used by another train, Progress, which was rescheduled to different time slots.

In 1991, the Interexpress category was discontinued, and the Primator was recategorised as an Express (Ex) (Czechoslovakia) / Schnellzug (D) (Germany).

In 1993, as part of a reorganisation of international train services through the Elbe valley, the Primator was replaced by the new EC Porta Bohemia.

See also

 History of rail transport in the Czech Republic
 History of rail transport in Germany
 List of named passenger trains of Europe

References

External links
 Private web page – about the history of the DR's international trains 1977 to 1993 
 Private web page – about the history of the IEx trains 

International named passenger trains
Named passenger trains of Germany
Named passenger trains of the Czech Republic
Railway services introduced in 1986